Sōma, Soma, Souma or Sohma (written: 相馬) is a Japanese surname. Notable people with the surname include:

, Japanese entrepreneur, philanthropist, patron of artists
, Japanese actor
, Japanese entrepreneur, philanthropist, patron of artists
, Japanese footballer
, Japanese footballer
, Japanese rugby union player
, Japanese footballer
, Japanese scholar and the founder of the Association for Aid and Relief
, Japanese football player.

Fictional characters
Soma family, characters from the manga series Fruits Basket
, a character in the manga series Battle Royale

See also
Sōma clan
Sōma

Japanese-language surnames